Brassica juncea, commonly brown mustard, Chinese mustard, Indian mustard, leaf mustard, Oriental mustard and vegetable mustard, is a species of mustard plant.

Cultivar 
Brassica juncea cultivars can be divided into four major subgroups: integrifolia, juncea, napiformis, and tsatsai.

Integrifolia

Juncea

Napiformis

Tsatsai

Uses

Nutrition 

In a  reference serving, cooked mustard greens provide  of food energy and are a rich source (20% or more of the Daily Value) of vitamins A, C, and K—K being especially high as a multiple of its Daily Value. Mustard greens are a moderate source of vitamin E and calcium. Greens are 92% water, 4.5% carbohydrates, 2.6% protein and 0.5% fat (table).

Cuisine 
The leaves, seeds, and stems of this mustard variety are edible. The plant appears in some form in African, Bangladeshi, Chinese, Filipino, Italian, Indian, Japanese, Nepali, Pakistani, Korean, Southern and African-American (soul food) cuisines. Cultivars of B. juncea are grown for their greens, and for the production of mustard oil. The mustard condiment made from the seeds of the B. juncea is called brown mustard and is considered to be spicier than yellow mustard.

Because it may contain erucic acid, a potential toxin, mustard oil is restricted from import as a vegetable oil into the United States. Essential oil of mustard, however, is generally recognized as safe by the U.S. Food and Drug Administration. In Russia, this is the main species grown for the production of mustard oil. It is widely used in canning, baking and margarine production in Russia, and the majority of Russian table mustard is also made from B. juncea.

The leaves are used in African cooking, and all plant parts are used in Nepali cuisine, particularly in the mountain regions of Nepal, as well as in the Punjabi cuisine in the northern part of the Indian subcontinent, where a dish called sarson da saag (mustard greens) is prepared. B. juncea subsp. tatsai, which has a particularly thick stem, is used to make the Nepali pickle called achar, and the Chinese pickle zha cai.
This plant is called "lai xaak" in Assamese and it is cultivated hugely during the winters. It is eaten in any form in Assam and Northeast, be it boiled or added raw in salad, cooked alone or with pork.

The Gorkhas of the Indian states of Darjeeling, West Bengal and Sikkim as well as Nepal prepare pork with mustard greens (also called rayo in Nepali). It is usually eaten with relish and steamed rice, but can also be eaten with roti (griddle breads). In Nepal it is also a common practice to cook these greens with meat of all sorts, especially goat meat; which is normally prepared in a pressure cooker with minimal use of spices to focus on the flavour of the greens and dry chillies. B. juncea (especially the seeds) is more pungent than greens from the closely related B. oleracea (kale, broccoli, and collard greens), and is frequently mixed with these milder greens in a dish of "mixed greens".

Chinese and Japanese cuisines also make use of mustard greens. In Japanese cuisine, it is known as takana and often pickled for use as filling in onigiri or as a condiment. Many varieties of B. juncea cultivars are used, including zha cai, mizuna, takana (var. integrifolia), juk gai choy, and xuelihong.  Asian mustard greens are most often stir-fried or pickled. A Southeast Asian dish called asam gai choy or kiam chai boey is often made with leftovers from a large meal. It involves stewing mustard greens with tamarind, dried chillies and leftover meat on the bone.  Brassica juncea is also known as gai choi, siu gai choi, xaio jie cai, baby mustard, Chinese leaf mustard or mostaza.

Green manure
Vegetable growers sometimes grow mustard as a green manure. Its main purpose is to act as a mulch, covering the soil to suppress weeds between crops. If grown as a green manure, the mustard plants are cut down at the base when sufficiently grown, and left to wither on the surface, continuing to act as a mulch until the next crop is due for sowing, when the mustard is dug in. In the UK, mustard sown in summer and autumn is cut down starting in October. April sowings can be cut down in June, keeping the ground clear for summer-sown crops. One of the disadvantages of using mustard as a green manure is its propensity to harbor club root.

Phytoremediation 
This mustard plant is used in phytoremediation to remove heavy metals, such as lead, from the soil in hazardous waste sites because it has a higher tolerance for these substances and stores the heavy metals in its cells. In particular,  Brassica juncea was particularly effective at removing cadmium from soil. The process of removing heavy metals ends when the plant is harvested and properly discarded. Phytoremediation has been shown to be cheaper and easier than traditional methods for heavy metal reduction in soils. In addition, it has the effect of reducing soil erosion, reducing cross-site contamination.

See also 
Sinapis alba (formerly Brassica alba) – yellow or white mustard, another mustard variety
Brassica oleracea – wild cabbage
Brassica nigra – black mustard, another mustard variety
Brassica rapa – related family of edible greens used in Asian cooking
Brassica carinata – Ethiopian mustard
For other edible plants in the family Brassicaceae, see cruciferous vegetables.

References

Further reading 
  .

External links 
 PROTAbase on Brassica juncea
 Brassica juncea

 Mustard Green Manures: Washington State University Extension paper on cover crops.
 

Asian vegetables
juncea
East Asian cuisine
South Asian cuisine
African cuisine
African-American cuisine
South American cuisine
Flora of Asia
Leaf vegetables
Phytoremediation plants